Anytime is the third studio album by American singer Brian McKnight. It was released by Mercury Records on September 23, 1997 in the United States. Following his moderately successful second album I Remember You (1995), McKnight consulted a wider range of collaborators to work with him on the album, including producers Sean Combs, Keith Thomas, Poke & Tone and songwriters Diane Warren, and Peter Black. While McKnight would provide most of the material by himself, Anytime deviated from the urban adult contemporary sound of his older work, with the former acts taking his music further into the hip hop soul genre.

Upon its release, the album garnered generally mixed reviews from music critics and  broke into the top 20 on the US Billboard 200, while becoming McKnight's first album to top the Top R&B/Hip-Hop Albums chart. A steady seller, it was certified double platinum by the Recording Industry Association of America (RIAA), indicating sales in excess of 2.0 units, and spawned several singles, including the top 20 hit "You Should Be Mine (Don't Waste Your Time)". Anytime marked McKnight's last record with Mercury Records before moving to Motown Records.

Background
Anytime marked McKnight's third studio album with Mercury Records. While his previous album I Remember You (1995) was certified gold by the Recording Industry Association of America (RIAA), it only sold half as much as its predecessor Brian McKnight (1992). Feeling initially pressured after what he called "the pseudo-failure of the I Remember You album,” McKnight, who was used to writing and producing most of his music by himself, decided to work with a wider range of musicians on the Anytime, including Sean "Puffy" Combs, Keith Thomas, Poke & Tone, Diane Warren, and Peter Black. With Anytime exposing McKnight to a wider audience, McKnight elaborated in a 2012 interview: "If Anytime was the spark, then Back at One became the fire. I was doing things then that I had never done before, that an audience had never heard or seen."

Critical reception

Anytime garnered generally mixed reviews from music critics. Stephen Thomas Erlewine from Allmusic felt that McKnight "continues with the mellow, romantic urban R&B that has become his trademark, but there's a new twist [...] McKnight hasn't exhausted its possibilities yet – Anytime is as strong as its predecessor – but "You Should Be Mine" and "Hold Me" suggest that he may be better off pursuing a new, hip-hop-influenced direction." In a contemporary review, The Rolling Stone Album Guide wrote that Anytime "signaled the start of a new phase in McKnight's career." In his review for Vibe, Darren McNeill called Anytime a "collection of mostly tired joints [...] McKnight's solo effort pales in comparison to work by emerging-soul craftsmen like Eric Benét and Rahsaan Patterson." In his consumer guide for The Village Voice, critic Robert Christgau gave Anytime a "cut" rating, indicating "an album that isn't worth your time or money – sometimes a Neither, more often a Dud."

Chart performance
In the United States, Anytime became McKnight's highest-charting album yet, peaking at number 13 on the Billboard 200. McKnight's first album to do so, it also reached the top on Billboards Top R&B/Hip-Hop Albums chart, spending three weeks at number one. According to Soundscan, Anytime had sold 1.7 million copies by January 1999. It was eventually certified double pltianum by the Recording Industry Association of America (RIAA), indicating sales in excess of 2.0 million copies. Billboard ranked the album fourth on its 1998 Top R&B/Hip-Hop Albums year-end chart.

Singles
The lead single "You Should Be Mine (Don't Waste Your Time)" became McKnight's biggest hit in four years, peaking at number 17 on the US Billboard Hot 100 and number 4 on the Hot R&B/Hip-Hop Songs chart. It featured rapper Mase, whose own career was at its peak during 1997. The title track was an even bigger hit, reaching number 6 on the Billboard Hot 100 Airplay chart in May 1998. Since it was not released as a physical single, it was ineligible to chart on the Hot 100, but was still one of the most played songs on the radio during 1998. Anytimes third single "The Only One for Me" hit number 14 on the Rhythmic Top 40, as again no physical single was released for it. The fourth and final single was "Hold Me" hit number 35 on the Hot 100 and number 12 on the Hot R&B/Hip-Hop Songs. The music video for "Hold Me" was released for the week ending on November 8, 1998.

Track listing

Samples
 "You Should Be Mine (Don't Waste Your Time)" contains a sample from "I Got Ants in My Pants", written and performed by James Brown.
 "Hold Me" contains an interpolation of "I Get Around", written by Roger Troutman, Larry Troutman, Shirley Murdock, Tupac Shakur, Ronald R. Brooks, and Gregory E. Jacobs.
 "Jam Knock" contains an interpolation of "I Can't Wait", written by John Robert Smith.

Personnel
Musicians

 Brian McKnight – lead vocals, background vocals , all instruments , keyboards , additional keyboards , keyboard programming , rhythm and vocal arrangement 
 Murray Adler – violin 
 Rick Baptist – trumpet/cornet 
 Bob Becker – viola 
 Peter Black – all instruments 
 Gary Bovyer – bass clarinet 
 Denyse Buffum – viola 
 Susan Chatman – violin 
 Ron Clark – violin 
 Jon Clarke – English horn 
 DJ (Step Up) Clue – background vocals 
 Lisa Cochran – background vocals 
 Larry Corbett – cello 
 Louise De Tullio – alto flute 
 David Duke – French horn 
 Bruce Dukov – violin 
 Chris Ermacoff – cello 
 Charles Farrar – drum programming 
 Kim Fleming – background vocals 
 Armen Garabedian – violin 
 Berj Garabedian – violin 
 James Getzoff – violin 
 Harris Goldman – violin 
 Endre Granat – violin 
 Mark Hammond – drum programming 
 Scott Haupert – viola 
 Tom Hemby – classical guitar 
 Dann Huff – guitars 
 Rodney Jerkins – additional drum programming 
 Suzie Katayama – orchestra contractor/coordinator and cello 
 Peter Kent – violin 
 Dan Greco – percussion 
 Janet Lakatos – viola 
 Joy Lyle – violin 
 Mike Markman – violin 
 Mase – rap vocals 
 Jerry McPherson – guitars 
 Joe Meyer – French horn 
 Bill K. Meyers – orchestra arrangement 
 Oscar Meza, Jr. – bass 
 Ralph Morrison – violin 
 Anthony Nance – drum programming , all instruments 
 Maria Newman – viola 
 Bob Peterson – violin 
 Poke & Tone – drum programming 
 Barbra Porter – violin 
 Kelly Price – background vocals and vocal arrangement 
 Steve Richards – cello 
 Cory Rooney – keyboards 
 Jay Rosen – violin 
 Anatoly Rosinsky – violin 
 Gerry Rotella – alto flute 
 John Scanlon – viola 
 Haim Shtrum – violin 
 Dan Smith – cello 
 Rudy Stein – cello 
 Troy Taylor – background vocals and drum programming , rhythm and vocal arrangement 
 Keith Thomas – arrangements, piano, synthesizer, and bass programming 
 Brad Warnaar – French horn 
 John Wittenberg – violin 
 Don Williams – percussion 
 Willie Max – background vocals 
 Ken Yerke – violin 
 David Young – bass 
 Bob Zimmitt – percussion 

Technical

 Tom Bender – assistant mix engineer 
 Brant Biles – mix engineer 
 Peter Black – mix engineer 
 "Bassy" Bob Brockmann – mix engineer 
 Andy Cardenas – recording engineer 
 Doug Elkins – assistant engineer 
 Dan Evans – production coordinator 
 Mick Guzauski – mix engineer 
 Doug "The Colonel" Kern – assistant engineer 
 Paul Logus – mix engineer 
 John "JM" Meredith – second engineer 
 Carl Nappa – recording engineer 
 Axel Niehaus – recording engineer 
 Greg Parker – assistant engineer 
 Joe Perrera – recording engineer 
 Herb Powers – mastering engineer
 Pierre Smith – second engineer 
 Ed Rasso – assistant mix engineer 
 David Retinas – orchestra engineer 
 Shaun Shankel – production coordinator 
 Mary Ann Souza – assistant engineer 
 Rich Travali – recording and mixing engineer 
 Bill Whittington – recording engineer 
 Chris Wood – recording engineer

Charts

Weekly charts

Year-end charts

Certifications

References

External links

1997 albums
Brian McKnight albums
Albums produced by Brian McKnight
Albums produced by Troy Taylor (record producer)